The 1897 Haskell Indians football team was an American football team that represented the Haskell Indian Institute (now known as Haskell Indian Nations University) as an independent during the 1897 college football season. The team compiled a 1–4 record and failed to register any points in its four losses. The team's sole victory was over Midland College of Atchison, Kansas. The 1895 season was the school's third competing in football. No record has been found identifying a coach for the team, though Kansas coach Wylie G. Woodruff led some practices and Frank Sweet was identified as the manager. The team played no home games.

Schedule

References

Haskell
Haskell Indian Nations Fighting Indians football seasons
Haskell Indians football